Search and destroy, seek and destroy, or simply S&D is a military strategy best known for its employment in the Malayan Emergency and the Vietnam War. The strategy consists of inserting ground forces into hostile territory, searching out the enemy, destroying them, and withdrawing immediately afterward. The strategy was developed to take advantage of the capabilities offered by a new technology, the helicopter, which resulted in a new form of warfare, the fielding of air cavalry, and was thought to be ideally suited to counter-guerrilla jungle warfare. The complementary conventional strategy, which entailed attacking and conquering an enemy position, then fortifying and holding it indefinitely, was known as "clear and hold" or "clear and secure". In theory, since the traditional methods of "taking ground" could not be used in this war (as all disputed territory was technically already under the control of allied forces), a war of attrition would be used, with the aim of systematically and relentlessly finding and killing enemy combatants; the "body count" would be the measuring tool to determine the success of the strategy of search and destroy.

Malayan Emergency 
The British conducted search and destroy operations in effort to flush out communist insurgents in the jungles during the early years of the Malayan Emergency. The Ferret Force, which was formed in 1948, became an important intelligence provider to the British military. The objective was to contact with native locals and intelligence as to the whereabouts of communist insurgents. With the information the captured persons provided, British troops would use search and destroy as a tactic in effort to flush out the insurgents. Once the communist guerrillas had been flushed out by search and destroy missions, they would be harried by denial of food and medical supplies, perhaps by surrendered enemy personnel willing to cooperate with the British, and eventually induced to surrender, tempted into betrayal, or killed off by a precise military strike, usually an ambush.

In the end, many British officials suspected that the search and destroy worked poorly because of the manner in which it was conducted. British troops often set fire to villages accused of supporting the insurgents and detained suspected collaborators. British units that discovered civilians providing assistance to insurgents were to detain and interrogate them to discover the location of insurgent camps. Insurgents had numerous advantages over British forces; they lived in closer proximity to villagers, they sometimes had relatives or close friends in the village, and they were willing to threaten violence or torture and murder village leaders as an example to the others, forcing them to assist them with food and information. British forces thus faced a dual threat: the insurgents and the silent network in villages who, willingly or unwillingly, supported them. While the insurgents rarely sought out contact with British forces, they used terrorist tactics to intimidate civilians and elicit material support.

British troops often described the terror of jungle patrols; in addition to having to watch out for insurgent fighters, they had to navigate difficult terrain and avoid dangerous animals and insects. Many patrols would stay in the jungle for days, even weeks, without encountering the enemy and then, without warning, insurgents would ambush them. British forces, unable to distinguish friend from foe, had to adjust to the constant risk of an insurgent attack. Such instances led to the infamous incident at Batang Kali in which 24 unarmed villagers were killed by British troops.

Vietnam
Search and destroy became an offensive tool that was crucial to General William Westmoreland's second phase during the Vietnam War. In his three-phase strategy, the first was to tie down the Viet Cong, the second phase was to resume the offensive and destroy the enemy, and the third phase was to restore the area under South Vietnamese government control. Most "Zippo" missions (so named for the Zippo lighters used to set fire to villages believed to be aligned with the Viet Cong) were assigned to the second phase around 1966 and 1967, along with clear-and-secure operations.

Search-and-destroy missions entailed sending out platoons, companies, or larger detachments of US troops from a fortified position to locate and destroy communist units in the countryside. These missions most commonly involved hiking out into the "boonies" and setting an ambush in the brush, near a suspected Viet Cong trail. The ambush typically involved the use of fixed Claymore antipersonnel mines, crossing lines of small arms fire, mortar support, and possibly additional artillery support called in via radio from a nearby fire support base.

In February 1967, some of the largest Zippo missions were conducted in the Iron Triangle, between Saigon and Routes 13 and 25. The area had a mass centre of Viet Cong logistics and headquarters, with some of the most high-ranking NLF officials stationed there. The offensive began with Operation Junction City, where the American units assigned had destroyed hundreds of tons of rice, killed 720 guerrillas, and captured 213 prisoners.

However, the number of defenders in the Iron Triangle area was thought to be over 10,000. The offensive failed to destroy the NLF's headquarters or to capture any high-ranking officers and so it had little effect toward Hanoi's plan. Both search-and-destroy and clear-and-hold missions stretched into the third phase, which began in 1968. The number of missions mounted, especially after the US was hit by General Võ Nguyên Giáp's Tet offensive in 1968. As the war grew more aggressive, so did the missions, and search-and-destroy and clear-and-secure operations became merged.

Search-and-destroy missions had many flaws. First, there was lack of distinction between clearing and search-and-destroy missions. Thus, clearing missions, which were less aggressive, eventually morphed into a more violent and brutal form of tactic, just as search-and-destroy missions were. With the lack of distinction between clearing, and search-and-destroy missions, pacification was not pushed. Such a response led to the Mỹ Lai massacre of 1968, where American troops massacred at least 347 Vietnamese civilians.

Guenter Lewy, a Professor of Political Science at the University of Massachusetts Amherst, argued that the generals and war planners severely underestimated the enemy's abilities to match and even to exceed US forces. Large numbers of Viet Cong troops would be killed or captured, but they were quickly replaced. Enemy forces were initially pushed out of certain territories, but as soon as the American forces left the areas, they simply returned with more reinforcements and weapons.

The effectiveness of the missions is also doubtful. In one of the first search-and-destroy missions northwest of Dầu Tiếng, named Operation Attleboro, a US report states that 115 U.S. soldiers were killed, and the North Vietnamese lost 1,062. In Operation Junction City, the report also states that 282 US soldiers were killed, and the Viet Cong lost 1,728 guerrillas.

Those estimated figures, however, should be considered in light of the by how they were obtained. They were almost exclusively gathered by indirect means: sensor readings, sightings of secondary explosions, reports of defectors or prisoners-of-war, and inference or extrapolation.

References

Sources
 Starry, Donn A. GEN. Mounted Combat In Vietnam; Vietnam Studies. Department of the Army, 1978.
 , e.g., pages 3–17.

Military terminology
Military tactics
Counterinsurgency